Kalyana Photo is a 1965 Indian Malayalam film,  directed by J. D. Thottan and produced by T. E. Vasudevan. The film stars Madhu, Adoor Bhasi, Muthukulam Raghavan Pillai and P. A. Thomas in the lead roles. The film had musical score by K. Raghavan.

Cast
Madhu
Adoor Bhasi
Muthukulam Raghavan Pillai
Kumari Padmini
P. A. Thomas
Kamaladevi
Kochappan
Kottarakkara Sreedharan Nair
Nirmala
Philomina

Soundtrack
The music was composed by K. Raghavan and the lyrics were written by Vayalar Ramavarma.

References

External links
 

1964 films
1960s Malayalam-language films